The Tansa River is a small river near Mumbai, India and is one of Mumbai's water sources via Tansa Lake. It is embanked by a dam built in 1892, which was then one of the largest masonry dams in the world. The dam has 1.31 cubic kilometres capacity of water retention. The dam has about 38 spillway gates.

References 

Rivers of Maharashtra
Rivers of India